Al Adib (Arabic: The Man of Letters) was a literary magazine which was based in Beirut, Lebanon. It was founded and edited by the Lebanese poet Albert Adib, and its title was a reference to his surname. The magazine existed between 1942 and 1983.

History and profile
Al Adib was started in Beirut in January 1942. Its founder was the poet Albert Adib who also edited it. In addition to literary work, Al Adib also covered articles on arts, science, politics and sociology. The magazine supported modernism and became an outlet for intellectuals from different backgrounds. In terms of poetry it argued that poems should not be necessarily dependent on meter and encouraged prose-like poems.

The last issue of Al Adib was dated August–December 1983. Some of its issues were archived by the Palestinian Museum.

Contributors
Al Adab featured articles not only by Lebanese writers, but also by other Arab figures from various countries. Their ideological origins were not homogenous. However, they all had the belief that individual rights were the cornerstone of the civic order.

Its major Lebanese contributors included Raif Khoury, Omar Fakhoury, Elias Abu Shabaki, Elias Khalil Zakharia, Michel Trad and Gabriel Jabbour. Other regular contributors were Wadih Palestine from Egypt, Edmond Rabbath from Syria Issa Naouri, and Thurayyā Malḥas, from Jordan. In the first issue dated January 1942 the Lebanese journalist Gebran Andraos Tueni published an article in which he argued that not dictatorial rules but democratic states should be supported. Poet Salah Al Asir published a controversial article in 1944 in Al Adib in which he developed a categorization of the contemporary Arab poets by their country of origin. However, he did not mentioned any poet of the Palestinian origin. Another contributor Ishaq Musa Al Husseini argued that access to the Palestinian poets and other literary figures was not easy for readers due to the fact that they did not publish books, but limited their contributions to certain magazines.

References

1942 establishments in Lebanon
1983 disestablishments in Lebanon
Defunct literary magazines
Defunct magazines published in Lebanon
Literary magazines published in Lebanon
Magazines published in Beirut
Magazines established in 1942
Magazines disestablished in 1983
Monthly magazines published in Lebanon
Modernism
Poetry literary magazines